Christianity is the dominant religion in Oceania. This article gives an outline of various religions in Oceania in 2010 according to a 2012 Pew Research Center report.

Religious distribution

Hyponyms
Religion in Australia
Religion in New Zealand
Religion in Hawaii
Religion in Fiji
Religion in Papua New Guinea
Religion in Samoa
Religion in Tonga
Religion in the Marshall Islands
Religion in Palau
Religion in Kiribati
Religion in Vanuatu

See also

Culture of Oceania
Major religious groups
Bahá'í Faith in Oceania
Buddhism in Oceania
Freedom of religion in Oceania by country
Hinduism in Oceania Countries
Religion in Africa
Religion in Asia
Religion in Europe
Religion in North America
Religion in South America

References

External links